List of Hawkeye episodes may refer to:

 List of Hawkeye (1994 TV series) episodes
 List of Hawkeye (2021 TV series) episodes